The Doctors' Building is a historic commercial structure in Cincinnati, Ohio, United States. Located on Garfield Place in the city's downtown, it is one of Cincinnati's few Late Gothic Revival commercial buildings.

The Doctors' Building was designed by the firm of Tietig and Lee, one of Cincinnati's leading architectural firms in the early twentieth century. Completed in 1923, it was one of the firm's most prominent commissions; it was Cincinnati's only large building erected for the sole purpose of providing space for doctors' offices, and its location on the southern side of a park ensures that it can be seen from a distance. Terracotta tiles cover the eight-story facade, which is structured primarily of brick, although reinforced concrete was also employed in construction. Some additional elements are constructed of metal or marble. The building is topped with a mostly flat roof with a small penthouse.

In 1986, the Doctors' Building was listed on the National Register of Historic Places. It qualified for the Register both because of its place in local history and because of its well-preserved historic architecture. Key to these two statuses was its place as the area's only large building constructed for physicians and as one of the most important buildings designed by Tietig and Lee.

References

Gothic Revival architecture in Ohio
National Register of Historic Places in Cincinnati
Office buildings in Cincinnati
Commercial buildings completed in 1923
Cincinnati Local Historic Landmarks

External links
View The Doctors' Building in 3D